Central Bedfordshire Council is the local authority for the a unitary authority of Central Bedfordshire in Bedfordshire, England. It was created on 1 April 2009 replacing Mid Bedfordshire, South Bedfordshire and Bedfordshire County Council.

Political control
Since the first election to the council in 2009 political control of the council has been held by the following parties:

Leadership
The first leader of the council was Tricia Turner, who had also chaired the shadow authority in the year leading up to the new council coming into effect, being leader of the outgoing Mid Bedfordshire District Council. The leaders of the council since its creation in 2009 have been:

Council elections
2009 Central Bedfordshire Council election
2011 Central Bedfordshire Council election (New ward boundaries)
2015 Central Bedfordshire Council election

District result maps

By-election results

References

External links

 
Central Bedfordshire District
Council elections in Bedfordshire
Unitary authority elections in England